|}

The Queen Alexandra Stakes is a flat horse race in Great Britain open to horses aged four years or older. It is run at Ascot each June over a distance of 2 miles, 5 furlongs and 143 yards (4,355 metres) and is the longest professional flat race in the world.

History
The event is named after Queen Alexandra, the consort of King Edward VII. It was established in 1864, and it was originally called the Alexandra Plate. It later became known as the Alexandra Stakes, and it was given its current title in 1931. It was formerly contested over 2 miles, 6 furlongs and 34 yards, but it was shortened as a result of the realignment of Ascot's track in 2005.

The Queen Alexandra Stakes is traditionally the last race on the final day of the five-day Royal Ascot meeting. It sometimes features horses which ran on the opening day in the Ascot Stakes, and the most recent to win both in the same year was Simenon in 2012.

It is the world's longest professional flat race, with a distance 21 yards longer than that of the Marathon Handicap at Pontefract. The extreme length can attract a varied field, and it often includes horses from hurdle racing.

Records
Most successful horse (6 wins):
 Brown Jack  – 1929, 1930, 1931, 1932, 1933, 1934

Leading jockey since 1960 (4 wins):
 Ryan Moore - Bergo (2010), Simenon (2012), Pique Sous (2014), Stratum (2021)

Leading trainer since 1960 (4 wins):
 Dick Hern – Grey of Falloden (1965), Balinger (1980), Cuff Link (1994, 1995)
 Willie Mullins - Simenon (2012), Pique Sous (2014), Stratum (2021, 2022)

Winners since 1977

 The 2005 running took place at York.

Earlier winners

 1865: Fille de l'Air
 1867: Lecturer
 1868: Blinkhoolie
 1869: Restitution
 1870: Trocadero
 1871: Rosicrucian
 1872: Musket
 1873: Cremorne
 1874: King Lud
 1875: Doncaster
 1876: Freeman
 1877: Coltness
 1878: Verneuil
 1879: Insulaire
 1880: Thurio
 1881: Robert the Devil
 1882: Fiddler
 1883: Faugh-a-Ballagh
 1884: Corrie Roy
 1885: St Gatien
 1886: Blue Grass
 1888: Timothy
 1889: Trayles
 1890: Netheravon
 1891: Gonsalvo
 1892: Blue-green
 1893: Bushey Park
 1894: Aborigine
 1895: Ravensbury
 1896: Pride
 1897: St Bris
 1898: Piety
 1899: Le Senateur
 1900: Gadfly
 1901: Kilmarnock
 1902: William the Third
 1903: Arizona
 1904: Zinfandel
 1905: Hammerkop
 1906: Hammerkop
 1907: Torpoint
 1908: Torpoint
 1909: Pure Gem
 1910: Lagos
 1911: Royal Realm
 1912: Jackdaw
 1914: Fiz Yama
 1921: Spearwort
 1922: Air Balloon
 1924: Rose Prince
 1926: Vermilion Pencil
 1927: Finglas
 1928: Finglas
 1929: Brown Jack
 1930: Brown Jack
 1931: Brown Jack
 1932: Brown Jack
 1933: Brown Jack
 1934: Brown Jack
 1935: Enfield
 1936: Cecil
 1937: Valerian
 1938: Epigram
 1946: Marsyas
 1947: Monsieur l'Amiral
 1948: Vulgan
 1950: Aldborough
 1951: Strathspey
 1954: Bitter Sweet
 1955: Bitter Sweet
 1956: Borghetto
 1957: Flying Flag
 1959: Bali Ha'i
 1960: Predominate
 1961: Moss Bank
 1962: Trelawny
 1963: Trelawny
 1964: no race
 1965: Grey of Falloden
 1966: Panic
 1967: Alciglide
 1968: Tubalcain
 1969: Laurence O
 1970: Parthenon
 1971: Hickleton
 1972: Celtic Cone
 1973: Peacock
 1974: King Levanstell
 1975: Cumbernauld
 1976: Coed Cochion

See also
 Horse racing in Great Britain
 List of British flat horse races
 Recurring sporting events established in 1864  – this race is included under its original title, Alexandra Plate.

References

 Paris-Turf:
 Racing Post:
 , 

 galopp-sieger.de – Queen Alexandra Stakes.
 pedigreequery.com – Queen Alexandra Stakes – Ascot.
 pedigreequery.com – Alexandra Plate – Ascot.

Flat races in Great Britain
Ascot Racecourse
Open long distance horse races
1864 establishments in England